Electric rotating machinery includes:

 Electric motor
 Electrical generator
 Motor-generator
 Rotary transformer